Anjasha al-Hadi or just Anjasha was a servant or slave of Muhammad mentioned in the Hadiths 
Anjasha is described in the sources as being black in skin color and was one of Muhammad's personal camel drivers. Muhammad put him in charge of the women of his family.

Al-Nasa'i attests that Anjasha was homosexual. There is also a claim that Anjasha was eventually evicted from Muhammad's living quarters because of his sexual orientation, but the isnad is weak, suggesting that this claim may have been fabricated.

See also
 LGBT in Islam
 Islamic views on slavery

References

Arabian slaves and freedmen